Burley in Wharfedale is a village and (as just Burley) a civil parish in the City of Bradford in West Yorkshire, England. It is situated in the Wharfedale valley.

Etymology
The name of Burley in Wharfedale is first attested in an eleventh-century copy of a charter issued in 972, as Burhleg. It appears in the Domesday Book in the spellings Burgelei, Burgelay, Burghelai, and Burghelay. The comes from the Old English words burg ('fortification') and lēah ('open land in a wood'), and thus meant 'open land in a wood, characterised by a fortification'. The specification 'in Wharfedale', deployed to avoid ambiguity with the various other English places of the same name, is first attested during the reign of Edward I of England, in the forms Burghlay in Querfildale and Burghlay in Quervesdale.

History 
Burley in Wharfedale was originally a small agricultural community with likely Roman and Anglo-Saxon roots. Burley developed in the late 18th and 19th centuries into an industrial village with many residents employed at Greenholme Mills, cotton mills powered from a goit fed from the River Wharfe. The cotton mill no longer operates and has recently been converted to flats, but the goit is now utilised to provide hydro electric power, and a weir remains.

The development of industrial and commercial centres in the nearby cities of Leeds and Bradford, combined with rail and bus links, caused major changes to the village in the early 20th century. Council housing was built in the 1920s and 1950s, as the village became a dormitory settlement for the two cities. With developments in the second half of the 20th century, Burley became a prosperous but socially diverse village. The village has a high percentage of elderly and retired people, and young families attracted by job opportunities, local schools and new housing developments.

In 2006, following a petition to the local authority and permission from the Parliament, Burley gained its own Parish Council.

Community

Burley population is 7,041. With Menston, Burley is part of Wharfedale ward in the metropolitan borough of the City of Bradford.

The village contains a range of local businesses. Burley public buildings include the Queens' Hall, originally built as a lecture hall for mill workers. Recent work by community groups has resulted in developments including a new nature reserve, and the village green which contains a central water feature.

The village has two state primary schools, Burley and Woodhead Primary School, Burley Oaks Primary School, and Ghyll Royd School & Pre-School, a private primary and nursery school for girls and boys aged 2–11. The school was established in 1889 by Augustus Wooldridge Godby. Formerly an all boys school, it became a co-educational school in 1999 when it moved location to Greystone Manor.

Burley churches are those of Anglicans, Calvinists, Methodists, and Catholics. The Anglican Parish Church is dedicated to St Mary.

Burley has a range of housing types and age, and terrace houses and cottages at the centre. Scalebor Park Hospital has been converted into private townhouses and flats.

Burley has a railway station on the Wharfedale Line, with direct trains to Leeds, Bradford and Ilkley, and links to other local urban areas.

Notable people

Burley Woodhead was home to the television presenter Richard Whiteley until his death in 2005. It may have been the birthplace of Walter of Burley (1274-1344), a medieval English logician and theologian. William Forster, reforming 19th-century politician was part owner of a mill in the village and is buried there. Mark James, Ryder Cup captain in 1999, lives in the village. British cyclist Scott Thwaites is from Burley; in 2012, he became the Men's Elite Road Race Champion in the National road cycling championships held at Otley. Magistrate and treasurer to the County Courts of Yorkshire John Peele Clapham commissioned Burley Grange and the Salem Church on Main Street.

Tom Sumner was awarded an MBE in 2000 for "For services to the community in Burley-in-Wharfdale, West Yorkshire."

Location grid

See also
Listed buildings in Burley in Wharfedale

References

External links 

Burley Parish Council Website
Burley-in-Wharfedale bridge campaign
Burley in Wharfedale Community Web Site

Burley Oaks Primary School

 
Villages in West Yorkshire
Civil parishes in West Yorkshire
Wharfedale
Geography of the City of Bradford